Manthrakodi is a 1972 Indian Malayalam film, directed by M. Krishnan Nair and produced by R. M. Veerappan. The film stars Prem Nazir, Vijayasree, Kaviyoor Ponnamma and Adoor Bhasi in the lead roles. The film had musical score by M. S. Viswanathan.

Cast

Prem Nazir as Venugopal
Vijayasree as Valsala
Kaviyoor Ponnamma as Saraswathi
Adoor Bhasi as Karnnadhanan
Jose Prakash as S. R. Nair/Swamiji
Pattom Sadan as Ghada Govindan
T. S. Muthaiah as Bhaskara Menon
Abbas
K. P. Ummer as Vikraman
Kanchana (old) as Dancer
Nadarajan
Paravoor Bharathan as Bharathan
Philomina as Valsala's grandmother
Sadhana as Rani

Soundtrack
The music was composed by M. S. Viswanathan and the lyrics were written by Sreekumaran Thampi.

References

External links
 

1972 films
1970s Malayalam-language films
Films scored by M. S. Viswanathan
Films directed by M. Krishnan Nair